Asikkala orthohantavirus (ASIV) is an Old World orthohantavirus isolated from Sorex araneus (pygmy shrew) in Germany and the Czech Republic. It is suspected to have a geographical distribution mapping with Seewis orthohantavirus.

References

Hantaviridae